Roland Arthur Charles North, CMG (28 January 1889 – 18 June 1961) was an English colonial administrator. He was the Secretary for Chinese Affairs in the Hong Kong colonial government. He was interned at Stanley Camp during the Japanese occupation of Hong Kong.

North was born at Beggearnhuish House, Nettlecombe, Somerset, England on 28 January 1889 to artist John William North. He joined the civil service in 1912 and became Secretary for Chinese Affairs in Hong Kong in 1936 and served until the fall of Hong Kong. He had also acted as Colonial Secretary of Hong Kong and Officer Administering the Government in 1936.

North was interned at the Stanley Camp throughout the occupation. During the occupation, he asked the leading figures in the Chinese community, including Shouson Chow and Robert Kotewall to collaborate with the Japanese, "to take upon themselves what should have been my duty in working with the Japanese." The acceptance of these figures after the war caused public outrage. North was repatriated to England in October 1945. He arrived in Southampton on 9 November on the Royal Mail Lines ship Highland Monarch. He was subsequently awarded Companion of the Order of St Michael and St George in 1946.

In 1947, from Southampton on P&O's Strathmore on 4 March 1947 North moved to Australia and lived in Katoomba, New South Wales until he died in 1961, aged 72. After his death, his widow Leo (died 1976) and daughter, Philippa, returned to live in Somerset. Philippa died in 2005.

References

1889 births
1961 deaths
Government officials of Hong Kong
Hong Kong civil servants
Members of the Legislative Council of Hong Kong
Australian people of English descent
Companions of the Order of St Michael and St George
World War II civilian prisoners held by Japan
British people in British Hong Kong